Steve Bendiak (c. 1933 – May 17, 2004) was a Canadian football player who played for the Edmonton Eskimos. He won the Grey Cup with them in 1954, 1955 and 1956. He is an honoured member of the Alberta Sports Hall of Fame.

References

1933 births
2004 deaths
Alberta Sports Hall of Fame inductees
Edmonton Elks players
Players of Canadian football from Alberta
Ice hockey people from Edmonton